Mohammadou Idrissou (born 8 March 1980) is a Cameroonian professional footballer who plays as a striker for SC Viktoria 06 Griesheim.

Club career 
On the last day of the summer transfer window 2011, Idrissou moved to 2. Bundesliga club Eintracht Frankfurt.

Having contributed 14 goals to Eintracht Frankfurt's return to the Bundesliga in 2011–12, Idrissou unexpectedly signed for 2. Bundesliga team 1. FC Kaiserslautern on 27 July 2012.

On 21 May 2014, he signed with Israeli side Maccabi Haifa. He was waived by the team on 13 November 2014.  In the following winter-break he moved to the Republic of Macedonia where he signed with FK Shkëndija.

In 2015 he moved back to Germany to KFC Uerdingen 05.

After two years he moved to Union Hallein.

During the summer transfer period 2018 he moved to Austria to FC Kufstein.

In October 2020, Idrissou signed for Viktoria Griesheim in the fifth-tier Hessenliga.

International career 
Idrissou was part of the Cameroon national team at the 2004 African Nations Cup, which finished top of its group in the first round of competition, before failing to secure qualification for the semi-finals. He also played for Cameroon at the 2003 FIFA Confederations Cup and 1999 FIFA World Youth Championship.

Honors
Cameroon
 Africa Cup of Nations: runner-up 2008

References

External links 
 
 
 

1980 births
Living people
Association football forwards
Cameroonian footballers
Cameroonian expatriate footballers
Cameroon under-20 international footballers
Cameroon international footballers
2003 FIFA Confederations Cup players
2004 African Cup of Nations players
2008 Africa Cup of Nations players
2010 Africa Cup of Nations players
2010 FIFA World Cup players
Coton Sport FC de Garoua players
Hannover 96 players
MSV Duisburg players
SC Freiburg players
FSV Frankfurt players
SV Wehen Wiesbaden players
Borussia Mönchengladbach players
1. FC Kaiserslautern players
Maccabi Haifa F.C. players
KF Shkëndija players
KFC Uerdingen 05 players
DSV Leoben players
Rot-Weiss Frankfurt players
Bundesliga players
2. Bundesliga players
Israeli Premier League players
Macedonian First Football League players
Austrian Regionalliga players
Cameroonian expatriate sportspeople in France
Cameroonian expatriate sportspeople in Germany
Cameroonian expatriate sportspeople in Israel
Cameroonian expatriate sportspeople in North Macedonia
Cameroonian expatriate sportspeople in Austria
Expatriate footballers in France
Expatriate footballers in Germany
Expatriate footballers in Israel
Expatriate footballers in North Macedonia
Expatriate footballers in Austria